The Cyprus women's national under-18 team is a national basketball team of Cyprus, administered by the Cyprus Basketball Federation.
It represents the country in women's international under-18 basketball competitions.

The team won the gold medal at the FIBA U18 Women's European Championship Division C three times.

See also
Cyprus women's national basketball team
Cyprus women's national under-16 basketball team
Cyprus men's national under-18 basketball team

References

External links
Archived records of Cyprus team participations

Basketball in Cyprus
Basketball teams in Cyprus
Women's national under-18 basketball teams
Basketball